Madipur Assembly constituency is one of the 70 Delhi Legislative Assembly constituencies of the National Capital Territory in northern India.

Overview
Present geographical structure of Madipur constituency came into existence in 2008 as a part of the implementation of the recommendations of the Delimitation Commission of India constituted in 2002.
Madipur is part of West Delhi Lok Sabha constituency along with nine other Assembly segments, namely, Uttam Nagar, Rajouri Garden, Hari Nagar, Tilak Nagar, Janakpuri, Vikaspuri, Dwarka, Matiala and Najafgarh.

Madipur Village
Madipur Village is a census town and a village in West Delhi Tehsil in West Delhi District of Delhi State, India. It is located 8 km to the east of District headquarters Rajouri Garden, 5 km from West Delhi, 12 km from State capital Delhi.
Madipur Village Pin code is 110063 and postal head office is Paschim Vihar.
Paschim Vihar (2 km), Basai Dara Pur (3 km), Khyala village (3 km), Rajouri Garden (3 km), Sunder Vihar (3 km) are the nearby villages to Madipur Village. Madipur Village is surrounded by North West Delhi Tehsil to the north, Central Delhi Tehsil to the east, North Delhi Tehsil to the east, Bahadurgarh Tehsil to the west.
Madipur is a big Yadav dominated village. It is famous for a pandavas era self originated shivling which is a source of pilgrimage to lakhs of devotees. Every year during shivratri festival it hosts a large fair near the temple.
This village is one of leading manufacturing centres of handmade female footwear in India.

Members of Legislative Assembly
Key

Election results

2020

2015

2013

2008

2003

1998

1993

References

Assembly constituencies of Delhi
Delhi Legislative Assembly